United Nations Security Council resolution 488, adopted on 19 June 1981, after recalling resolutions 425 (1978), 426 (1978), 427 (1978), 434 (1978), 444 (1979), 450 (1979), 459 (1979), 467 (1980), 474 (1980) and 483 (1980) considering the report from the Secretary-General on the United Nations Interim Force in Lebanon (UNIFIL), the Council noted the continuing need for the Force given the situation between Israel and Lebanon.

The resolution extended the mandate of UNIFIL until 19 December 1981, commending the work the Force did in the area. It reiterated its support for development efforts in Lebanon and requested help to the Government of Lebanon.

Resolution 488 was adopted by 12 votes to none, while East Germany and the Soviet Union abstained, and China did not participate.

See also
 Blue Line
 Israeli–Lebanese conflict
 List of United Nations Security Council Resolutions 401 to 500 (1976–1982)

References
Text of the Resolution at undocs.org

External links
 

 0488
Israeli–Lebanese conflict
 0488
 0488
1981 in Israel
1981 in Lebanon
June 1981 events